Ravdangiin Davaadalai (born March 20, 1954) is a retired Mongolian judoka. At the 1980 Summer Olympics he won the bronze medal in the men's Lightweight (71 kg) category.

External links
 
profile

1954 births
Living people
People from Khovd Province
Mongolian male judoka
Judoka at the 1980 Summer Olympics
Olympic judoka of Mongolia
Olympic bronze medalists for Mongolia
Olympic medalists in judo
Medalists at the 1980 Summer Olympics
20th-century Mongolian people
21st-century Mongolian people